Au Pays de Vocabulon is a French educational video game released in 1997 for Windows and Macintosh.

External links

References

1997 video games
Europe-exclusive video games
Classic Mac OS games
Educational video games
Single-player video games
Video games developed in France
Windows games